was an athletic stadium in Osaka, Osaka, Japan.

It was used as a football stadium for the 1923 Far Eastern Games.

External links

Buildings and structures completed in 1923
1964 disestablishments in Japan
Defunct sports venues in Japan
Defunct football venues in Japan
Sports venues in Osaka